The Originals is an American supernatural drama television series created by Julie Plec for The CW. A spin-off of The Vampire Diaries, the series makes use of certain characters and story elements from the series of books of the same name. The first season premiered with a special preview on October 3, 2013, following the season premiere of its parent series, before premiering in its regular time slot on October 8, 2013.

The series is set in New Orleans which the Mikaelson family and original vampires helped to build. In the first season, the focus was primarily on Klaus (Joseph Morgan), Elijah (Daniel Gillies), and Rebekah (Claire Holt) who found out in the backdoor pilot, aired on April 25, 2013, how Hayley Marshall (Phoebe Tonkin) was pregnant with Klaus's child, and has now given birth to a werewolf/witch/vampire hybrid named Hope (Summer Fontana). Having fled the city many years ago, they return to find Marcel (Charles Michael Davis) (Klaus's adoptive son) leading the city. The family decide to take back the city. The series also revolves around the relationship between them and other supernatural beings, including witches. In the second season, Kol (played by both Nathaniel Buzolic and Daniel Sharman) and Finn (played by both Yusuf Gatewood and Casper Zafer) come back.

In May 2017, The CW renewed the series for a fifth and final season, which premiered on April 18, 2018, and concluded on August 1, 2018.

Series overview

Episodes

Pilot (2013) 

"No. overall" and "No. in season" for the pilot dictate the airing and location of the episode within the parent series.

Season 1 (2013–14)

Season 2 (2014–15)

Season 3 (2015–16)

Season 4 (2017)

Season 5 (2018)

Webisodes

The Originals: The Awakening

Ratings

References

External links
 
 

Episodes
Lists of American horror-supernatural television series episodes